Ayman El Ghobashy (born 7 February 1996) is an Egyptian footballer who plays as a forward for Eastern Company.

Career
In 2016, El Ghobashy trained with Portuguese top flight side Benfica after winning the football reality television show "The Victorious". He started his career with Nogoom in the Egyptian second tier. In 2017, El Ghobashy was sent on loan to Gibraltarian club Gibraltar United, where he was paid with cryptocurrency.

In 2019, El Ghobashy was sent on loan to Al Ittihad (Alexandria) in Egypt, where he made 11 appearances and scored 0 goals. On 23 September 2019, he debuted for Al Ittihad (Alexandria) during a 0–1 loss to Zamalek.

References

External links

1996 births
Al Ittihad Alexandria Club players
Association football forwards
Eastern Company SC players
Egyptian expatriate footballers
Egyptian footballers
Egyptian Premier League players
Expatriate footballers in Gibraltar
Gibraltar Premier Division players
Gibraltar United F.C. players
Living people
Nogoom FC players